The Zapolyarnoye gas field is a natural gas field located in the Yamalo-Nenets Autonomous Okrug. It was discovered in 1965 and developed by Gazprom. It began production in 2001 and produces natural gas, oil, and condensates. The total proven reserves of the Zapolyarnoye gas field are around 95 trillion cubic feet (2300×109m³), and production is slated to be around 9.74 Billion cubic feet/day (274×105m³) in 2010.

In 2017 an oil pipeline between Zapolyarnoye and Purpe was launched by Transneft. The pipeline can reportedly transfer up to 7.5 million tonnes of oil per year.

References

Natural gas fields in Russia
Natural gas fields in the Soviet Union